Berny Camps (born 20 March 1971) is a Dutch archer. He competed in the men's individual and team events at the 1992 Summer Olympics.

References

External links
 

1971 births
Living people
Dutch male archers
Olympic archers of the Netherlands
Archers at the 1992 Summer Olympics
People from Venray
Sportspeople from Limburg (Netherlands)